The Department of Immigration was an Australian government department that existed between July 1945 and June 1974.

Scope
Information about the department's functions and/or government funding allocation could be found in the Administrative Arrangements Orders, the annual Portfolio Budget Statements and in the Department's annual reports.

At its creation, the Department's functions were:
Admission of contract immigrants
Deportation and Registration of Aliens
Emigration of Children and Aboriginals 
Encouraged migration
Immigration
Indentured coloured labor
Nationality and Naturalization
Passports
Publication of Newspapers in foreign languages
Repatriation of destitute Australians

Structure
The Department was a Commonwealth Public Service department, staffed by officials who were responsible to the Minister for Immigration.

References

Ministries established in 1945
Immigration